The 1999 IGA SuperThrift Classic singles was the singles event of the fourteenth edition of the IGA SuperThrift Classic; a WTA Tier III tournament held in Oklahoma City, United States. Venus Williams was the defending champion and won in the final 6–4, 6–0 against Amanda Coetzer.

Seeds
The top two seeds received a bye to the second round.

Draw

Finals

Top half

Bottom half

Qualifying

Seeds

Qualifiers

Qualifying draw

First qualifier

Second qualifier

Third qualifier

Fourth qualifier

External links
 ITF tournament edition details
 Tournament draws

U.S. National Indoor Championships
IGA SuperThrift Classic